CJMT-DT (channel 40) is a television station in Toronto, Ontario, Canada. It is one of two flagship stations of the Canadian multilingual network Omni Television. CJMT-DT is owned and operated by Rogers Sports & Media alongside sister Omni outlet CFMT-DT (channel 47) and Citytv flagship CITY-DT (channel 57). The stations share studios at 33 Dundas Street East on Yonge-Dundas Square in downtown Toronto, while CJMT-DT's transmitter is located atop the CN Tower.

History

The station signed on the air on September 16, 2002, broadcasting on UHF channel 44. In 2004, CJMT moved its channel allocation to UHF channel 69. The station was licensed by the Canadian Radio-television and Telecommunications Commission (CRTC) as part of the same process that approved independent station CKXT-TV (channel 51, now defunct). The "J" in its callsign has no particular meaning, except that it was an available callsign that maintained the "MT" lettering (standing for "Multicultural Television") from CFMT (CJMT was formerly the callsign of a now-defunct AM radio station in Chicoutimi, Quebec).

On October 8, 2007, Rogers announced that the operations of the two Omni stations would relocate from 545 Lake Shore Boulevard West to 33 Dundas Street East. CJMT and CFMT integrated their operations into the building – which it shares with City flagship CITY-DT, which moved into the facility the previous month – on October 19, 2009.

Programming
As a multicultural station, CJMT airs programming in the South Asian languages (such as Urdu and Hindi), as well as in Mandarin, Cantonese, Japanese, Korean, Somali and Pashto. As with its sister station CFMT, CJMT also aired syndicated English-language programming until September 25, 2015. The original series Metropia was also broadcast on the station, with repeats on CFMT. In 2014, CJMT began to regularly simulcast CBS late-night talk shows Late Show with David Letterman and The Late Late Show with Craig Ferguson, both of which moved from the main Omni television channel. Both shows have since concluded, with their successors airing on Global and CTV respectively. The first season of the Fox series Empire also aired on CJMT (its second season moved to City).

Sports programming
During the 2007 season, CJMT began airing late-afternoon NFL games, usually the alternate to whatever aired on Sportsnet and CKVU-DT in Vancouver. These games were moved to CITY-DT as of the 2008 season. Rights to these games were later assumed by CTV as of the 2017 season. During the 2014 season, CJMT aired several Thursday Night Football games in simulcast with Sportsnet and CBS.

On June 27, 2013, CJMT broadcast Mandarin-language coverage of a Toronto Blue Jays Major League Baseball game started by Taiwanese player Chien-Ming Wang. This event marked the first ever Canadian MLB telecast in the language.

Newscasts
CJMT-DT broadcasts five hours of locally produced newscasts each week (with one hour each weekday). The station carries two local newscasts aimed at Southern Ontario's Asian demographic, presented in the Mandarin and Cantonese languages.

CJMT launched its news operation the day the station began operations on September 16, 2002, with newscasts airing in Mandarin and South Asian languages as well as a Cantonese language newscast that moved to the station from sister station CFMT. The South Asian edition had previously aired once a week, and was known as South Asian Newsweek. The South Asian newscast was cancelled in June 2013, due to corporate cutbacks at Rogers Media, that included the shutdown of production operations at CJMT's sister stations CJCO-DT in Calgary and CJEO-DT in Edmonton.

In September 2017, with the launch of Omni National, Omni 2 started production of news programs in Mandarin, Cantonese and Punjabi.

Notable former on-air staff
 Stanley So – former anchor of OMNI News: Cantonese Edition

Technical information

Subchannel

Analogue-to-digital conversion
CJMT shut down its analogue signal, over UHF channel 69, on August 31, 2011, the official date in which full-power television stations in larger Canadian television markets transitioned from analogue to digital broadcasts under federal mandate. The conversion coincided with a change in transmitters, from the analogue transmitter atop First Canadian Place to a digital transmitter on the CN Tower alongside its Rogers Media sister stations.

The station's digital signal remained on its pre-transition UHF channel 51. In August 2012, the digital signal relocated to UHF channel 40, after that channel was vacated due to the shutdown of CKXT-DT. Through the use of PSIP, digital television receivers originally displayed the station's virtual channel as its former UHF analogue channel 69, which was among the high band UHF channels (52–69) that were removed from broadcasting use as a result of the transition; however, its virtual channel was remapped to its physical digital channel 40 with the relocation of its digital signal to that frequency.

Transmitters

References

External links

JMT-DT
JMT-DT
Television channels and stations established in 2002
2002 establishments in Ontario